David Chandler may refer to:

 David Chandler (chemist) (1944–2017), American physical chemist
 David G. Chandler (1934–2004), British historian specializing in Napoleonic history
 David P. Chandler (born 1933), American historian specializing in Cambodian history
 David A. Chandler, justice of the Supreme Court of Mississippi
 David Leon Chandler (1937–1994), American journalist
 David Chandler (writer) (1912–1990), American screenwriter, novelist and playwright